Harnam Singh Wala is a village located in the district of Bathinda, in the Indian state of Punjab.

Bathinda
Villages in Bathinda district